Channel Rock may refer to the following:
Channel Rock (Hong Kong)
Channel Rock (Argentine Islands) in Antarctica
Channel Rock (McFarlane Strait) in Antarctica
Channel Rock (Canada)

See also
 Rock Channel, a connecting waterway between River Brede and River Tillingham